Capital Cities is an American pop duo from Los Angeles, California, formed in 2008 by Ryan Merchant (vocals, keyboard, guitar) and Sebu Simonian (vocals, keyboard). Their debut EP was released on June 7, 2011, with lead single "Safe and Sound" which became their first, and only, top ten hit single. The band currently consists of Ryan Merchant, Sebu Simonian, Manny Quintero on bass guitar, Spencer Ludwig on trumpet, Nick Merwin on guitar and Channing Holmes on drums.

A subsequent single, "Kangaroo Court", was released on March 27, 2012. The band was featured on the Pop Up #1 compilation selected by Perez Hilton that was released on August 7, 2012. The band's song "Safe and Sound" charted at #1 on the US Alternative Songs chart. The song was also used in a German Vodafone commercial, in a television commercial in the United States and Canada for the 2014 Mazda 3, and in an Air New Zealand in-flight safety video. The song "Center Stage" was featured on ESPN's First Take where they played a short segment of the retro-sounding track before going to commercial breaks.

The band's debut album, In a Tidal Wave of Mystery, was released June 4, 2013 via Capitol Records in partnership with Lazy Hooks. It was the first release of new material on Capitol with a Universal Music Group catalog number. The album debuted at number sixty-six on the Billboard 200 chart.

History
The two musicians met after Merchant responded to Simonian's open ad on Craigslist offering his production services. They began jingle-writing together. After three years successfully  composing music for commercials and advertising campaigns, the duo formed Capital Cities. The band released its debut, self-titled EP in June 2011 via their label, Lazy Hooks.

In 2012, the band signed with Capitol Records. In partnership with Nik Visger and Lazy Hooks, the label released In a Tidal Wave of Mystery, the band's debut album, on June 4, 2013. The album takes its name from the lyrics of its top 10 Modern Rock radio hit "Safe and Sound",  the album's first single. The song has been used in promotional campaigns for HBO, Smart Car, Microsoft, Mazda and many other spots. The album includes the songs "Kangaroo Court" and "I Sold My Bed, But Not My Stereo". Outkast's André 3000, vocalist Shemika Secrest and NPR's Frank Tavares are featured on the song "Farrah Fawcett Hair". The album is produced and mixed entirely by the pair of Merchant and Simonian. The artwork is by Brazilian artist João Lauro Fonte.

The band embarked on its first-ever North American outing, the "Dancing with Strangers" tour, with special guests Gold Fields, which kicked off on April 23, 2013, at the Crescent Ballroom in Phoenix, Arizona. Capital Cities' May 9 show at New York City's Irving Plaza sold out two months in advance as well two nights at the El Rey Theatre in Los Angeles. All proceeds from the June 7 show at the El Rey went to MusiCares and a Place Called Home. The band has also appeared and performed at Sundance, SXSW, SweetLife, and ULTRA.

The band premiered the official video of "Safe and Sound" on April 25, 2013 on Vevo. The clip was directed by Grady Hall (who also has worked with Beck and Modest Mouse). In the video, the song fuels a mash-up of the past 100 years of dance, presided over by the band at the newly restored Los Angeles Theater in downtown Los Angeles. The video featured work from Emmy-nominated choreographer Mandy Moore. The video was nominated for two 2013 MTV Video Music Awards: Best Art Direction and Best Visual Effects. The video won a 2013 MTV Video Music Award for Best Visual Effects.

In May 2013, "Safe and Sound" reached number one on the German Singles Chart.

September 5, 2013 marked the premiere of the "Kangaroo Court" music video. The video features appearances from Darren Criss, Shannon Woodward, and Channing Holmes. The story tells of a zebra (Merchant) who has been forbidden from a club, The Kangaroo Court. Attempting entry disguised as a horse, he falls for a lapdog (Woodward). Her date that night, a bulldog (Criss), becomes jealous and reveals the zebra for who he actually is. The zebra is placed under arrest for his crime and sent to court to face a kangaroo judge (Holmes). He is found guilty immediately and is executed by lion (Simonian).

The band was nominated for a Grammy Award for Best Music Video.

Capital Cities joined Katy Perry on the North American leg of her Prismatic World Tour.

In April and May 2016, nearly three years after the release of the band's debut album, the official Capital Cities Facebook page made two posts strongly suggesting that new music was in the works. Two years later, the band released four singles within the span of four weeks and followed up with the release of Solarize on August 10, 2018 as their latest album to date.

Discography

Studio albums

Extended plays

Singles

Notes

Awards and nominations

References

External links
 
 

American musical duos
American synth-pop groups
Capitol Records artists
Electronic music groups from California
Musical groups established in 2010
2010 establishments in California
Indie pop groups from California